Lake Gogebic  is the largest natural inland lake of the Upper Peninsula of Michigan. It is located within the one million acre (4,000 km²) Ottawa National Forest. Lake Gogebic State Park is located along its western shore.

It is in the far western end of the Upper Peninsula, close to the Wisconsin border, and in parts of two counties, Gogebic County and Ontonagon County. The lake is also in two time zones, central and eastern.

Though the lake is a natural body of water, the level is regulated by the Upper Peninsula Power Company through its Bergland Dam located downstream on the West Branch of the Ontonagon River.
 
In 2005 a state Department of Natural Resources survey found Black bullhead, Black crappie, Brown bullhead, Burbot, Cisco, Common shiner, Creek chub, Golden shiner, Northern pike, Pumpkinseed, Rock bass, Smallmouth bass, Walleye, White sucker, and Yellow perch in the lake.

See also
List of lakes in Michigan

References

External links
Map and Fishing guide

Lakes of Michigan
Lakes of Gogebic County, Michigan
Bodies of water of Ontonagon County, Michigan